Haynes House may refer to:

Alexander Haynes House, DeLand, Florida, listed on the National Register of Historic Places (NRHP)
Tidwell-Amis-Haynes House, Senoia, Georgia, listed on the NRHP in Georgia
John and Dorothy Haynes House, Fort Wayne, Indiana, NRHP-listed
Elwood Haynes Museum, Kokomo, Indiana, NRHP-listed
Lemuel Haynes House, South Granville, New York, NRHP-listed
Haynes House (Decherd, Tennessee), listed on the NRHP in Tennessee
Tipton-Haynes State Historic Site, Johnson City, Tennessee, NRHP-listed

See also
 Haines House (disambiguation)